Rahmat Rural District is a rural district (dehestan) in Seyyedan District, Marvdasht County, Fars Province, Iran. At the 2006 census, its population was 11,487, in 2,728 families.  The rural district has 27 villages.

References 

Rural Districts of Fars Province
Marvdasht County